Martin Hauswald (born 3 March 1982) is a German former professional footballer who played as a midfielder.

Career 
Born in Sebnitz, Hauswald started his career at FV Dresden-Nord, moving shortly afterwards for 150,000 Deutsche Mark to Tennis Borussia Berlin. After they were relegated, he moved back to Dresden, played one more season there before transferring to Rot-Weiss Essen. After spells at SC Preußen Münster and 1. FC Union Berlin, Hauswald signed for Eintracht Braunschweig, making 25 appearances between 2005 and 2007 for the team in the 2. Bundesliga. After 11 games for Holstein Kiel, he made over 100 appearances in four years for FC Rot-Weiß Erfurt and signed for SV Eintracht Trier 05 in 2011. A year later he returned east to sign for ZFC Meuselwitz, where he spent one season before leaving in 2013, signing for Wacker Nordhausen.

Further reading

References

External links 
 
 Martin Hauswald at kicker.de 

1982 births
Living people
People from Sebnitz
People from Bezirk Dresden
German footballers
Footballers from Saxony
Association football midfielders
2. Bundesliga players
3. Liga players
Tennis Borussia Berlin players
Rot-Weiss Essen players
SC Preußen Münster players
1. FC Union Berlin players
Eintracht Braunschweig players
Holstein Kiel players
FC Rot-Weiß Erfurt players
SV Eintracht Trier 05 players
ZFC Meuselwitz players
FSV Wacker 90 Nordhausen players